is a left lateral slip fault in central Japan, Gifu Prefecture, which ruptured causing the 1891 Mino–Owari earthquake (otherwise known as the Nōbi earthquake) in 1891. It caused a 6m vertical offset and 8m left lateral offset, and ruptured over 80 km.  The quake was the largest ever recorded in inland Japan.

See also
List of earthquakes in Japan

References

External links

 Seismic Faults Observation & Experience House
 Long-Term Seismic Behavior of a Fault Involved in a Multiple-Fault Rupture: Insights from Tectonic Geomorphology along the Neodani Fault, Central Japan

Seismic faults of Japan